National Highway 49 (or NH 49) was a National Highway in southern India under former numbering system.. It traversed coast-to-coast linking Kochi in Kerala with Dhanushkodi in Tamil Nadu. It crosses the famous Pamban Bridge (Annai Indira Gandhi Bridge) before crossing into Rameswaram island. The 5 km road between Mukundarayar Chathiram and Dhanuskodi was destroyed during the 1963 cyclone and was rebuilt.

Government of India has recently announced that the destroyed stretch will be rebuilt at a cost of INR 250 million. The road between Madurai and Ramanathapuram is soon to be converted from the present single road to a four-lane highway. Union minister for road transport and shipping Nitin Gadkari participated in the foundation stone-laying ceremony for the Rs 1,387-crore project in Madurai on 17 July 2015.
An initial outlay of Rs 900 crore was made and now the project has been sanctioned Rs 1,387 crore. The 75 km stretch from Madurai to Paramakudi will be converted into a four-lane road, while the remaining 39 km stretch from Paramakudi to Ramanathapuram widened to form a two-lane road with paved shoulders. Falling under the NH-49, this project is one of the largest to be implemented in Tamil Nadu by the NHAI in the recent times.

Route 
Old NH 47 is now NH 85. NH 85 starts from the junction of NH 66 at Kundannoor in Kochi and terminates at Muguntharayar Chattram between Rameswaram and Dhanushkodi.

Kerala: Kochi Metropolitan Area(Kundannoor, Thripunithura, Thiruvankulam, Puthencruz), Kolenchery, Muvattupuzha, Kothamangalam, Neriamangalam, Adimali, Pallivasal, Munnar, Devikulam and Poopara.

Tamil Nadu:Bodimettu, Bodinayakkanur, Theni, Andipatti, Usilampatti, Madurai, Tiruppuvanam, Manamadurai, Parthibanur, Paramakudi , Ramanathapuram, Mandapam, Pamban, Rameswaram, Mukundarayar Chathiram And Dhanushkodi.

See also 
 List of National Highways in India (by Highway Number)
 National Highways Development Project

References

External links
Old NH 49 on OpenStreetMap
 NH 85 on MapsofIndia.com

49
49
National highways in India (old numbering)
Roads in Ernakulam district
Roads in Idukki district